Bradley William Ference (born April 2, 1979) is a Canadian former professional ice hockey defenceman who played 250 games in the National Hockey League (NHL).

Playing career
Born in Calgary, Alberta, Ference played junior hockey with the Spokane Chiefs, and Tri-City Americans of the Western Hockey League. Ference was drafted in the first round, 10th overall, of the 1997 NHL Entry Draft by the Vancouver Canucks.

Before ever playing a game for the Canucks, Ference was traded on January 17, 1999 along with Pavel Bure, Bret Hedican and third-round selection in the 2000 NHL Entry Draft (Robert Fried) to the Florida Panthers for Dave Gagner, Ed Jovanovski, Mike Brown, Kevin Weekes and a first-round selection in the 2000 NHL Entry Draft (Nathan Smith).

Ference spent nearly four years in the Panthers organization before being traded to the Phoenix Coyotes on March 8, 2003 for Darcy Hordichuk and a second-round selection in the 2003 NHL Entry Draft.

After a year and half with the Coyotes, and the lock-out year of 2004–2005 spent in France, Ference was traded to the New Jersey Devils on November 25, 2005 for Pascal Rheaume, Ray Schultz and Steven Spencer. He was on the move again at the end of the season, signing a one-year contract as an unrestricted free agent on July 26, 2006 with the Calgary Flames.

After Ference's contract with the Flames ended he was signed by the Detroit Red Wings and spent a year with their AHL affiliate, the Grand Rapids Griffins.

Ference was offered a 1-year deal from Anyang Halla of Asia League Ice Hockey in summer of 2008, but did not sign as his wife was pregnant. Ference retired from professional hockey in 2008, returned to Calgary, and began a new career as a firefighter in 2009.

Career statistics

Regular season and playoffs

International

References

External links

1979 births
Living people
Albany River Rats players
Calgary Flames players
Ice hockey people from Calgary
Canadian ice hockey defencemen
Florida Panthers players
Grand Rapids Griffins players
Louisville Panthers players
HC Morzine-Avoriaz players
National Hockey League first-round draft picks
Omaha Ak-Sar-Ben Knights players
Phoenix Coyotes players
San Antonio Rampage players
Spokane Chiefs players
Tri-City Americans players
Vancouver Canucks draft picks
Canadian expatriate ice hockey players in France